The Battle of Antique was fought in Antique province, between the forces of Spanish colonial government and the Antiqueño Katipuneros led by the Visayan General Leandro Fullon. The Katipuneros decisively won the battle.

References 
 History of Antique by the National Library of the Philippines Digital Collection

Battles involving Spain
Battles of the Philippine Revolution